Ailbhe McDonagh (born 29 November 1982 in Dublin) is an Irish concert cellist and composer. Her compositions have been published by Boosey & Hawkes, Hal Leonard, RIAM and ABRSM. She performs worldwide as a soloist, chamber musician, recording artist and teaches at the Royal Irish Academy of Music in Dublin, Ireland.

Career 
Irish cellist, Ailbhe McDonagh, performs throughout Ireland and internationally as a soloist and chamber musician. She is a graduate of the Eastman School of Music, Rochester, New York, USA (Steven Doane) and the Royal Irish Academy of Music, Dublin, Ireland. Ailbhe currently teaches cello performance at the RIAM.

Ailbhe gave her debut recital with celebrated Irish pianist John O'Conor at the National Concert Hall in Dublin, Ireland. She performs throughout Europe, Asia and North America and has appeared as a concerto soloist numerous times in Ireland and abroad.

As a chamber musician, Ailbhe performs in a duo, The McDonagh Sisters, with pianist Orla McDonagh. She is also a member of the Ficino Ensemble and the crossover traditional Irish music group Trio Elatha where she plays traditional Irish music on the cello.

Ailbhe is an established composer with numerous compositions and commissions to her name. London based publishers Boosey & Hawkes have released two books of her piano music entitled It's a Piano Thing. In 2021, Ailbhe published further collections of compositions titled It’s a Cello Thing, a collection of two books of pedagogical pieces for cello. Her compositions have featured regularly in the syllabi of ABRSM, RCM, RIAM and other music institutions.  Ailbhe collaborates with many composers and other artists worldwide and has recorded several works of contemporary music.

Ailbhe joined the cello faculty of the RIAM in 2010 and is invited to give masterclasses worldwide. Her debut solo album 'It’s a Cello Thing' was named CD of the Week on Ireland’s national classical music station RTÉ Lyric FM, and is played internationally. 'Skellig' was released in 2020 with the McDonagh Sisters.

In 2021, Ailbhe released the complete Beethoven cello and piano sonatas with John O'Conor on the Steinway label. The recording was positively reviewed with Classical Music Sentinel stating "McDonagh and O'Conor coalesce perfectly, as if propelled by the music's undertow, and echo each other's expressive mien with dynamic balance" and awarding it as one of their Essential Recordings. Classical Explorer remarks that the duo "take the opening of Op. 102/1 to whispered heights, and again later there is a most appealing sense of two-as-one. They find buoyant, almost dancing, rhythms." AllMusic gave the album 4.5 out of 5 stars.

She performs on a Postacchini cello.

Recordings

Albums

Publications

Books

References

External links 
 
 Lecturer profile page at RIAM

Living people
Alumni of the Royal Irish Academy of Music
Irish women classical composers
1982 births
Eastman School of Music alumni
Musicians from County Dublin
Irish cellists
Women cellists
Irish classical cellists
Irish classical composers
21st-century Irish musicians
People educated at Loreto College, St Stephen's Green
21st-century classical composers
21st-century women composers
21st-century cellists